The 1991 Philips Austrian Open, also known as the Austrian Open Kitzbühel, was a men's tennis tournament held on outdoor clay courts at the Kitzbüheler Tennisclub in Kitzbühel, Austria that was part of the ATP World Series of the 1991 ATP Tour. It was the 21st edition of the tournament and was held from 29 July until 4 August 1991. Third-seeded Karel Nováček won the singles title.

Finals

Singles

 Karel Nováček defeated  Magnus Gustafsson 7–6(7–2), 7–6(7–4), 6–2
 It was Nováček's 3rd singles title of the year and 6th of his career.

Doubles

 Tomás Carbonell /  Francisco Roig defeated  Pablo Arraya /  Dimitri Poliakov 6–7, 6–2, 6–4

References

External links
 ITF tournament edition details

Austrian Open(tennis)
Austrian Open Kitzbühel
Austrian Open